

Mosques

Dhaka Division

Dhaka District

Faridpur District

Gazipur District

Kishoreganj District

Munshiganj District

Narayanganj District

Tangail District

Barisal Division

Barisal District

Jhalokati District

Chittagong Division

Brahmanbaria District

Chandpur District

Chittagong District

Comilla District

Feni District

Lakshmipur District

Noakhali District

Khulna Division

Jessore District

Jhenaidah District

Satkhira District

Bagerhat District

Please add TEN DOME MOSQUE,ranabijopur, bagerhat as number one oldest mosque in Bangladesh.

Mymensingh Division

Rajshahi Division

Naogaon District

Nawabganj District

Pabna District

Rajshahi District

Rangpur Division

Dinajpur District

Gaibandha District

Kurigram District

Rangpur District

Sylhet Division

Habiganj District

Moulvibazar District

Sunamganj District

Sylhet District

Eidgahs

References

External links